John Branch (2 May 1901 – 11 March 1950) was a Guyanese cricketer. He played in one first-class match for British Guiana in 1921/22.

See also
 List of Guyanese representative cricketers

References

External links
 

1901 births
1950 deaths
Guyanese cricketers
Guyana cricketers
Sportspeople from Georgetown, Guyana